Vernon George "Tod" Handley  (11 November 1930 – 10 September 2008) was a British conductor, known in particular for his support of British composers.  He was born of a Welsh father and an Irish mother into a musical family in Enfield, Middlesex.  He acquired the nickname "Tod" because his feet were turned in at his birth, which his father simply summarised: "They toddle".  Handley preferred the use of the name "Tod" throughout his life over his given names.

Education and studies
Handley attended Enfield Grammar School.  While in school, he watched the BBC Symphony Orchestra in its studio in Maida Vale, where by his own account he learned some of his conducting technique by observing Sir Adrian Boult. Later the two corresponded in the early 1950s and met around 1958.  He spent a period in the Armed Forces and then attended Balliol College, Oxford, where he read English philology and became musical director of the University Dramatic Society. He also studied at the Guildhall School of Music in London, where his performing instrument was the double bass (in addition to the trombone and violin). After graduating he worked as a nursery gardener, bricklayer and petrol pump attendant during the day, studying and conducting amateur orchestras and choirs in the evening. He then became Sir Adrian Boult's pupil. During their first meeting he "was put through the worst two hours of counterpoint and harmony that I've ever faced" and was then asked how he would conduct a page of a score that Boult put in front of him, Sir Arnold Bax's Third Symphony, which Handley happened to have studied.  Handley later conducted that work in the first concert he gave in London, with the symphony orchestra of Morley College. Handley remained a devoted champion of the music of Bax throughout his career.

Career
Vernon Handley's first professional engagement was in 1960, conducting the Bournemouth Symphony Orchestra. In 1962, Handley was appointed the musical director of the newly formed Guildford Philharmonic Orchestra, with which he programmed much of Bax's music and made the first recording of Bax's Symphony No. 4.  Handley and the orchestra also recorded Gerald Finzi's Intimations of Immortality. He also began conducting non-UK orchestras such as the Amsterdam Philharmonic, Stockholm Philharmonic, Swedish Radio Symphony Orchestra, Malmö Symphony and Berlin Radio Symphony; he led the Strasbourg Philharmonic through a UK tour in 1982 consisting of French and Russian music. In 1983 he was appointed Associate Conductor of the London Philharmonic Orchestra. He was Principal Conductor of the Ulster Orchestra from 1985 to 1989, and had the title of Conductor Laureate from 2003 until his death.  From 1986 to 1988, he was chief conductor of the Malmö Symphony Orchestra and was active with several other Swedish orchestras, broadcasting regularly on Swedish radio.

He held assistant conductorships elsewhere, was Conductor Emeritus of the Royal Liverpool Philharmonic Orchestra, and conducted a number of others in concert, for broadcast and for recording. Handley was appointed Principal Conductor of the English Symphony Orchestra in January 2007.

Handley is much revered for his enthusiastic and untiring championship of British music, including many lesser known, unfashionable or relatively neglected composers whose artistic reputations and popularity he often helped to revive. Although he claimed to be just as attached to composers from elsewhere, the majority (some 90 out of 160) of Handley's recordings were of British music. He is said to have recorded as many as a hundred premières of British works, including highly successful series on Hyperion Records of the symphonies of Robert Simpson and Sir Granville Bantock. Simpson dedicated his Symphony No. 10 to Handley. According to Lewis Foreman, Handley "single handedly transformed the reception of the music of Granville Bantock." He also went on to make the first largely complete official recording of Bantock's monumental Omar Khayyám setting.  He contributed a foreword to Alan Poulton's Dictionary-Catalog of Modern British Composers (Greenwood Press) and to a book on Adrian Boult. He also recorded symphonies by Bax, Moeran and Stanford for Chandos Records as well as discs of other orchestral works. Handley recorded the symphonies of Elgar and Vaughan Williams for EMI. Handley also recorded many works by Sir Malcolm Arnold for Conifer Records, which were subsequently reissued in the UK by Decca Records.

He felt that his career might have suffered due to his championing of British music, but added « I believe there are two sorts of conductors – musician conductors and career conductors. I have always tried to be the former... and I really wouldn't have it any other way.

Handley held clear views on the style of conductors, saying "Music isn't mime; you shouldn't fraudulently convince people that they have heard what they haven't", and stating "jet-set musical careers... are little to do with the work, more to do with PR". Questioning the influence of television on conducting, Handley recalled Boult telling him, "Do remember, won't you, that you are playing to the blind man in the audience."

Handley received numerous awards, such as The Gramophone magazine's Special Achievement Award in 2003 for services to British Music  (sparking a "Nod for Tod" honours campaign); and the Lifetime Achievement Award at the Classical BRIT Awards on 3 May 2007 at the Royal Albert Hall. He was appointed a Commander of the Order of the British Empire (CBE) in the 2004 Queen's Birthday Honours (having declined appointment as an Officer of the order in 1988). He held an Honorary Doctorate from the University of Surrey and was a Fellow of the Royal College of Music.

Handley died at home in Monmouthshire on 10 September 2008. He had been scheduled to conduct Prom 2 of the 2008 BBC Proms season on 19 July, but withdrew because of ill health; Paul Daniel replaced him. After Handley's death, the director of The Proms, Roger Wright, announced the dedication of the 10 September Prom concert (Prom 73) to Handley.

Handley married and divorced three times. He met his first wife, Barbara Black, while studying at Balliol. They married in 1954 and had a daughter and two sons, one of whom died aged 13 months.  His second marriage in 1977 to Victoria Parry-Jones produced a son and a daughter.  His third marriage to the flautist Catherine Newby in 1987 produced a son.  The five remaining children survive Handley.

Discography

Awards and nominations

ARIA Music Awards
The ARIA Music Awards is an annual awards ceremony that recognises excellence, innovation, and achievement across all genres of Australian music. They commenced in 1987. 

! 
|-
| 1999
| he Eternal Rhythm (with Melbourne Symphony Orchestra)
| Best Classical Album
| 
|

References

External links
Biographical information, tributes
Biography on Clarion
BBC brief biography On the occasion of an honorary doctorate from the University of Surrey in 2004
Interview about Bax - contains biography
Vernon Handley on Hyperion, Chandos and Dutton Epoch

English conductors (music)
British male conductors (music)
1930 births
2008 deaths
People from Enfield, London
Commanders of the Order of the British Empire
Alumni of Balliol College, Oxford
Honorary Members of the Royal Philharmonic Society
Alumni of the Guildhall School of Music and Drama
People educated at Enfield Grammar School
20th-century British conductors (music)
20th-century British male musicians